Dendrocousinsia fasciculata is a species of plant in the family Euphorbiaceae. It is endemic to western and central Jamaica.

References

Hippomaneae
Flora of Jamaica
Endangered plants
Endemic flora of Jamaica
Taxonomy articles created by Polbot